This is a list of the public meetings held in Lower Canada between May and November 1837, both those held by the Parti patriote as well as those held by the Constitutional Party. On June 15th, Governor Gosford issued a proclamation forbidding public county meetings. The proclamation was ignored. On June 29th, Constitutionals started holding their own county meetings.

References

 Jean-Paul Bertrand. (1988) Assemblées publiques, résolutions et déclarations de 1837-1838, Montréal: VLB Éditeur and the Union des écrivains québécois, 304 pages 

Lower Canada
Lower Canada Rebellion
1837 in Lower Canada
1837 conferences